USS Sayona II (SP-1109) was a United States Navy patrol vessel in commission from 1917 to 1918.

Sayona II was built as the private motorboat or motor yacht Tip Top by H. Manley at Crosby, Massachusetts, in 1907. She later was renamed Sayona II.

In July 1917, the U.S. Navy acquired Sayona II under a free lease from her owner, H. W. Hower of Rome, New York, for use as a section patrol boat during World War I. She was commissioned as USS Sayona II (SP-1109) on 3 August 1917.

Assigned to the 5th Naval District, Sayona II served on submarine net patrol duty in the Hampton Roads, Virginia, area until the spring of 1918.  She then was reassigned to Customs House duty in the Hampton Roads area, which she continued through the end of World War I.

Sayona II was decommissioned on 30 December 1918 and returned to Hower the same day.

References

Department of the Navy Naval History and Heritage Command Online Library of Selected Images: U.S. Navy Ships: USS Sayona II (SP-1109), 1917-1918. Previously the Civilian Motor Boat Tip Top and Sayona II
NavSource Online: Section Patrol Craft Photo Archive Sayona II (SP 1109)

Patrol vessels of the United States Navy
World War I patrol vessels of the United States
Ships built in Massachusetts
1907 ships
Individual yachts